Rakowski (feminine: Rakowska; plural: Rakowscy) is a Polish surname. It is related to various surnames in other languages.

Related surnames

People
 Abraham Abba Rakovski (1854–1921), writer and translator
 Adrian Rakowski (born 1990), Polish football player
 Bronisław Rakowski (1895–1950), Polish general
 David Rakowski (born 1958), American composer
 John Rakowski (born 1948), Australian boxer
 Joseph Rakowski, American politician
 Lukáš Rakowski (born 1982), Czech figure skater
 Mary Rakowski DuBois, American chemist
 Mieczysław Rakowski (1926–2008), Polish politician
 Richard Rakowski (born 1952), American entrepreneur
 Teresa Rakowska-Harmstone (1927—2017), Polish-Canadian political scientist
 Georgi Sava Rakovski (1821—1867), Bulgarian revolutionary, and an important figure of the Bulgarian National Revival and resistance against Ottoman rule.

See also
 
 
 Rakovsky

Polish-language surnames